Pranāma (Sanskrit: प्रणाम, praṇāma, "obeisance, prostration or bowing forward") is a form of respectful or reverential salutation (or reverential bowing) before something or another person – usually one's elders, spouse or teachers – as well as anyone deeply respected such as a deity, found in Indian culture and Hindu, Buddhist, Jain and Sikh traditions.

The gesture, also known as the apology hand gesture, is also used as an apology in certain situations.

Etymology
Pranama is derived from pra (Sanskrit: प्र) and ānama (Sanskrit: आनम); pra as prefix means "forward, in front, before, very,  or very much", while ānama means "bending or stretching". Combined pranama means "bending, bowing in front" or "bending much" or "prostration". In cultural terms, it means "respectful salutation" or "reverential bowing" before another, usually elders or teachers or someone deeply respected such as a deity.

Customs
It is found in Indian culture and Hindu traditions.

Types of Pranāma

There are six types of Pranam:
Ashtanga (Sanskrit: अष्टाङ्ग, lit. eight parts) - Uras (Chest), Shiras (Head), Drishti (Eyes), Manas (Attention), Vachana (Speech), Pada (Feet), Kara (Hand), Jahnu (Knee).
Shashthanga (Sanskrit: षष्ठाङ्ग, lit. six parts) – touching the ground with toes, knees, hands, chin, nose and temple.
Panchanga (Sanskrit: पञ्चाङ्ग, lit. five parts) – touching the ground with knees, chest, chin, temple and forehead.
Dandavat (Sanskrit: दण्डवत्, lit. stick) – bowing forehead down and touching the ground.
Namaskara (Sanskrit: नमस्कार, lit. adoration) – folded hands touching the forehead. This is a more common form of salutation and greeting expressed between people.
Abhinandana (Sanskrit: अभिनन्दन, lit. congratulations) – bending forward with folded hands touching the chest.

As an apology
It is a Hindu custom to apologize in the form of a hand gesture with the right hand when a person's foot accidentally touches a book or any written material (which are considered as a manifestation of the goddess of knowledge Saraswati), money (which is considered as a manifestation of the goddess of wealth Lakshmi) or another person's leg. The offending person first touches the object with the fingertips and then the forehead and/or chest.

Related forms of salutations
A form of pranama is Charanasparsha (Sanskrit: चरणस्पर्श, lit. touching the feet) a bowing combined with the touching of the feet, as a mark of respect. It may be seen in temples during Ddarshana. This related type of pranama is most common in Indian culture. It is done in order to show respect towards elderly people like parents, grandparents, elderly relatives, teachers and saints.

See also 
 Añjali Mudrā
 Culture of India
 Guru-shishya tradition
 Indian honorifics
 Mudras
 Namaste
 Puja (Hinduism)
 Pādodaka
 Sembah

Notes

External links

 Touching Feet in India – Indian Tradition of Touching Feet, Concept of Touching Elders' Feet in India

Hindu traditions
Salutes
Gestures of respect